Serafim Maniotis (born 17 May 2000) is a Greek professional footballer who plays as a defensive midfielder for Super League club Levadiakos.

Career

PAOK
In 2014, Maniotis joined the academies of PAOK.

Loan to Veria
In 2019, Maniotis was loaned to Veria until the summer of 2020.

Honours
Levadiakos
Super League 2: 2021–22

References

External links

2000 births
Living people
Greek footballers
Greece youth international footballers
Super League Greece players
Football League (Greece) players
Gamma Ethniki players
Super League Greece 2 players
PAOK FC players
Veria NFC players
Levadiakos F.C. players
Association football midfielders
Footballers from Lamia (city)